Ronaldo Octavian Andrei Deaconu (born 13 May 1997) is a Romanian professional footballer who plays as an attacking midfielder or a winger for Ekstraklasa club Korona Kielce.

Club career
Deaconu started his professional career with ASA Târgu Mureș in 2016, after having previously played as a junior for FC Steaua București, the Gheorghe Hagi Academy, and Dutch clubs Feyenoord and Twente, respectively. He made his senior debut for Târgu Mureș on 5 August 2016, aged 19, in a 0–3 Liga I loss to Politehnica Iași.

During the winter transfer window of 2017, Deaconu moved to fellow league team Concordia Chiajna. He totalled three goals from 55 Liga I matches, before transferring abroad to HNK Gorica on 1 February 2019.

He appeared sparingly during his spell in Croatia, and in the summer of that year returned to his country after Sepsi OSK acquired him for €100,000. On 22 July 2020, he played the full 90 minutes as his side lost 0–1 to FCSB in the Cupa României final.

On 26 August 2020, Deaconu signed a two-year deal with Gaz Metan Mediaș as a free agent. In the 2020–21 season, he amassed 39 games and eleven goals in all competitions. On 15 October 2021, he scored two long-range goals in the span of two minutes to secure a 2–1 home win over Dinamo București.

Following a short stint in China with Shaanxi Chang'an Athletic, on 28 July 2022 Deaconu joined Polish side Korona Kielce on a two-year contract.

International career
Deaconu was called up by the Romania under-23 team to the postponed 2020 Summer Olympics, appearing once in a goalless draw with New Zealand which led to a group-stage exit.

Personal life
Deaconu's father is a football fan, and named his son after Brazilian international Ronaldo.

Career statistics

Club

Honours
Sepsi OSK
Cupa României runner-up: 2019–20

References

External links

1997 births
Living people
Footballers from Bucharest
Sportspeople from Bucharest
Romanian footballers
Association football midfielders
Association football wingers
Liga I players
Croatian Football League players
China League One players
Ekstraklasa players
ASA 2013 Târgu Mureș players
CS Concordia Chiajna players
HNK Gorica players
Sepsi OSK Sfântu Gheorghe players
CS Gaz Metan Mediaș players
Shaanxi Chang'an Athletic F.C. players
Korona Kielce players
Romania youth international footballers
Olympic footballers of Romania
Footballers at the 2020 Summer Olympics
Romanian expatriate footballers
Romanian expatriate sportspeople in Croatia
Expatriate footballers in Croatia
Romanian expatriate sportspeople in China
Expatriate footballers in China
Romanian expatriate sportspeople in Poland
Expatriate footballers in Poland